Tomáš Bárta (born 12 March 1999) is a Czech racing cyclist, who currently rides for UCI ProTeam .

Major results

2019
 1st  Road race, National Under-23 Road Championships
 3rd V4 Special Series Debrecen–Ibrany
 7th Memoriał Henryka Łasaka
2020
 7th GP Kranj
 10th Puchar Ministra Obrony Narodowej
2021
 2nd Road race, National Under-23 Road Championships
 3rd Trofej Umag
 5th Overall Dookoła Mazowsza
 6th GP Slovenian Istria
 8th Overall Baltic Chain Tour
 8th Overall Okolo Jižních Čech
 8th Fyen Rundt
 10th Overall Course de Solidarność et des Champions Olympiques
 10th Puchar Ministra Obrony Narodowej
2022
 2nd Overall Gemenc Grand Prix
1st Stage 2
 2nd Trofej Umag
 2nd Grand Prix Poland
 2nd GP Kranj
 4th GP Slovenian Istria
 4th Grand Prix Nasielsk-Serock
 6th Overall Dookoła Mazowsza
 6th Trofej Poreč
 9th Memorial Philippe Van Coningsloo

References

External links

1999 births
Living people
Czech male cyclists
Sportspeople from Olomouc